Vakhitov is a surname. Notable people with the surname include:

Mullanur Waxitov (1885–1918), Tatar revolutionary
Airat Vakhitov, Guantanamo prisoner